Maloye Lyskarevo is a rural locality (a village) in Nikolskoye Rural Settlement, Ust-Kubinsky District, Vologda Oblast, Russia. The population was 6 as of 2002.

Geography 
Maloye Lyskarevo is located 46 km northwest of Ustye (the district's administrative centre) by road. Bolshoye Lyskarevo is the nearest rural locality.

References 

Rural localities in Ust-Kubinsky District